Tris(2,4-di-tert-butylphenyl)phosphite is an organophosphorus compound with the formula [(C4H9)2C6H3O]3P.  This white solid is a widely used stabilizer in polymers where it functions as an antioxidant as well as other roles. The compound is a phosphite ester derived from di-tert-butylphenol.

References

Phenol ethers
Organophosphites